The 1996–97 Ohio Bobcats men's basketball team represented Ohio University in the college basketball season of 1996–97. The team was coached by Larry Hunter and played their home games at the Convocation Center. They finished the season 17–10 and finished third in the MAC regular season with a conference record of 12–6.

Roster

Schedule

|-
!colspan=9 style=|Non-conference regular season

|-
!colspan=12 style=| MAC regular season

|-
!colspan=9 style=| MAC Tournament

Source:

Statistics

Team Statistics
Final 1996–97 Statistics

Source

Player statistics

Source

References

Final 1997 Division I Men's Basketball Statistics Report
Ohio Record Book

Ohio Bobcats men's basketball seasons
Ohio
Bob
Bob